The women's long jump event  at the 1980 European Athletics Indoor Championships was held on 2 March in Sindelfingen.

Results

References

Long jump at the European Athletics Indoor Championships
Long
Euro